Amor de Perdição may refer to:

 Amor de Perdição (novel), a 19th-century Portuguese novel by Camilo Castelo Branco
 Amor de Perdição (TV series), a Brazilian telenovela, based on the novel
 Amor de Perdição (1978 film), a Portuguese film
 Amor de Perdição (1943 film), a Portuguese film with António Silva